Robert Leonard "Dutch" McCall (December 27, 1920 – January 8, 1996) was a pitcher in Major League Baseball. He played for the Chicago Cubs.

During World War II, McCall served in the United States Army rising to the rank of corporal. He is buried in the Little Rock National Cemetery (Section 24).

References

External links

1920 births
1996 deaths
Major League Baseball pitchers
Chicago Cubs players
Baseball players from Tennessee
People from Columbia, Tennessee
Nashville Vols players
United States Army personnel of World War II
United States Army non-commissioned officers
Burials at Little Rock National Cemetery